Julian Lamar Posey (born July 17, 1988) is an American football cornerback who is currently a free agent. He was signed by the New York Jets in 2011 as an undrafted free agent in 2011. He played college football at Ohio.

Posey has also played for the Miami Dolphins and Cleveland Browns.

Early years
Posey attended LaSalle High School in Cincinnati, Ohio. Posey was named to the first-team All-Greater Catholic League South. He was an honorable mention for the Division I all district and also was named honorable mention all-area by the Cincinnati Enquirer. He was selected to the first-team all-conference, all-city and all-division on the track team.

College career
Posey played four seasons at Ohio. In 2009, he played 12 games including the game against Northern Illinois in which he started. In that game, Posey recorded an interception which he returned for touchdown for 41 yards.

In his senior year, he finished the year with 46 tackles, and a fumble recovery for a touchdown. On September 4, 2010, he recorded 2 tackles, one pass deflection, and a fumble recovery which he returned for 38 yards for the touchdown against Wofford.

In his junior year, Posey had 29 tackles, 6 passes defended and 2 interceptions (with one scoring a touchdown). On September 26, 2009, he recorded 4 tackles against Tennessee State which Ohio lost 34–23. On October 3, 2009, he recorded 3 tackles against Bowling Green State University with Ohio winning the game 44–37. On October 10, 2009, he recorded 5 tackles and one pass defended against Akron as Ohio won 19–7. On October 17, 2009, Posey recorded 3 tackles against Miami as Ohio scored 28 to the RedHawks' 7. On October 24, 2009, Posey recorded 2 tackles and one Interception which he returned for 58 yards against Kent State University but Ohio recorded a loss of 20–11.

In his sophomore year, Posey had 14 tackles and 2 passes defended for the season. On August 30, 2008, he recorded 2 tackles and one passes defending against Wyoming in the season opener but his team lost 21–20.

In his freshman year, Posey had 54 tackles, 8 passes defended, 2 interceptions and 2 forced fumbles. On September 1, 2007, he recorded 5 tackles against Gardner–Webb University as Ohio won 36–14. On September 8, 2007, he recorded 5 tackles and a pass defended against Louisiana-Lafayette as Ohio won the game 31–23. On September 15, 2007, Posey recorded 3 tackles against 18th ranked Virginia Tech but Ohio lost 28–7. On September 22, 2007, he recorded 4 tackles and an interception against Wyoming but Ohio loss 34–33. On September 29, 2007, Posey recorded 5 tackles against Kent State but Ohio lost 33–25. On October 13, 2007, he recorded 6 tackles against Eastern Michigan as Ohio won with a final score of 48–42. On October 20, 2007, Posey recorded 7 tackles, 2 Forced fumbles, and 2 passes defended against University of Toledo with Ohio losing the game 43–40. On October 27, 2007, he recorded 5 tackles, one Interception and one passes defended against Bowling Green State as Ohio won 38–27.

Professional career

New York Jets
On July 28, 2011, Posey signed with the New York Jets as an undrafted free agent. On September 3, he was waived and two days later he was signed to the practice squad.

On September 19, Posey was released from the practice squad but on January 2, 2012, he signed a reserve/future contract. On August 31, 2012, he was released.

Miami Dolphins
On October 3, 2012, Posey was signed to the Miami Dolphins' practice squad after the team promoted De'Andre Presley to the active roster. He played in two games in the 2012 season.

Cleveland Browns
On September 2, 2013, he signed with the Cleveland Browns to join the practice squad. On October 18, 2013, he was promoted from the practice squad to the active roster. On October 21, 2013, he was released.

Minnesota Vikings
On June 2, 2014, Posey was claimed off waivers by the Minnesota Vikings.

Hamilton Tiger-Cats
Posey was signed to the Hamilton Tiger-Cats' practice roster on September 16, 2014.

Personal life
His younger brother is Hamilton Tiger Cats wide receiver DeVier Posey.

References

External links

 Ohio Bobcats bio
 Hamilton Tiger-Cats bio
 New York Jets bio 
 Miami Dolphins bio
 Cleveland Browns bio

1988 births
Living people
American football cornerbacks
Ohio Bobcats football players
New York Jets players
Miami Dolphins players
Cleveland Browns players
Minnesota Vikings players
Players of American football from San Francisco
Players of Canadian football from San Francisco
Winnipeg Blue Bombers players